Antonio Graceffo (born September 6, 1967) is an American economist, China analyst, martial artist, and author who has lived in several Asian countries. He is a frequent guest, providing analysis of the Chinese economy and geopolitics, on various shows on New Tang Dynasty Television, including Talking Points, The Wide Angle, China in Focus, and Forbidden News. He is also the host of the web TV show, Martial Arts Odyssey, which traces his ongoing journey through Asia learning martial arts in various countries. Graceffo is credited with helping to revitalize the lost Khmer martial art of Bokator by being the first to report on it in English in the post-Pol Pot era. Beyond martial arts, Graceffo is also a student of multiple languages, including Mandarin Chinese, Thai, Khmer, Vietnamese, German, Spanish, Italian, and French.

Life and education
Born to Sicilian parents, Antonio Graceffo is originally from New York City. When he was nine, his family moved to Tennessee and for the next eight years he spent school days in Tennessee and holidays and summers in New York. He moved back to New York at the age of 17.

Graceffo spent seven years in the United States Armed Forces starting with the Army National Guard. At Fort Benning, Georgia he went through boot camp and completed infantry school. Later, he graduated from Non-Commissioned Officer's Academy. He then served in the Navy and the US Merchant Marines.

As a child, he was identified as having dyslexia and being learning disabled. He was in Special Ed classes until high school. In high school, his grade point average was only 1.7 on a 4-point scale. Guidance councilors told him he would most likely not be able to graduate university, but he read constantly to make up for his lack of formal education.
 
He graduated from Middle Tennessee State University with a degree in Foreign Language and English. He studied applied linguistics/translation at the University of Mainz in Germany for four years. He also did an advanced Diploma in TESOL at Trinity College, England and did graduate business diplomas through Heriot-Watt University in Scotland. He worked as a translator and teacher in Europe for most of the four years he was in school there and then worked in Costa Rica for one year. After that, he returned to New York and went through a financial training program and worked as a financial planner, and then a wealth manager. Eventually, he became assistant head of private wealth management for a major private bank.

The September 11 attacks prompted him to leave his career as an investment banker on Wall Street to pursue full-time adventure writing in Asia. After arriving in Taiwan in 2001, Graceffo's quest to discover Asia's diverse martial arts led him to the original Shaolin Temple in China and a Muay Thai monastery in Thailand, as well as to Cambodia, Vietnam, Korea, the Philippines, and Burma. While in Burma in 2008, he was targeted by the military junta then ruling the country, because of his support for the Shan people.

In 2013, Graceffo was accepted into a PhD program at Shanghai University of Sport, where he joined the wrestling team. His dissertation, written in Chinese, focused on Chinese wrestling. In June 2016, he became the first American to receive a PhD in Wu Shu from the Shanghai University of Sport.

After completing his PhD at Shanghai University of Sport, Graceffo studied international trade at Shanghai University, completed a China-MBA at Shanghai Jiao Tong University, and has worked as a China economist.

Early involvement in martial arts
At the age of 13, Graceffo began studying martial arts from H. David Collins, at the American School of Empty Hand Fighting (Fire and Water) in Blountville, Tennessee. At age 20, he began training and competing in boxing and boxed in "smokers" and other informal boxing contests throughout his time in the military and beyond. He continued with boxing in the Merchant Marines. He later stopped fighting during his university studies in Germany, but then resumed training after seeing his first Ultimate Fighting Championship video in 1997. He was training and sometimes flying to Tennessee to participate in Friday night fights until he left the US for Asia in October 2001.

Martial arts achievements
In 2005, Graceffo was the first foreign student of the Khmer martial art of Bokator. The story he wrote in Black Belt magazine was the first article ever written about the art in that publication. In 2007, he became one of two Americans promoted on the same day, to the rank of Black Krama in Bokator; they were the first foreigners to obtain this rank. In the same year, he traveled into Burma and shot videos with a master of Lai Tai, a kung fu type art practiced by the Shan people. To date, this is the first video ever shot of the art. In 2009, Antonio was the first non-Muslim student of Silat Kalam, a Muslim martial art in Malaysia, and in 2011 was given a national award, Silat Kalam Warrior. He was the first non-Muslim to receive this award.

In the summer of 2013, Graceffo returned to the Shaolin Temple to learn Sanda (sport), contesting and winning a smoker Sanda fight. He also commenced studying Chinese traditional wrestling, initially on a team in Beijing and later at the Shanghai University of Sport, where he won a silver medal at the Shanghai International BJJ Tournament in the traditional wrestling division for beginners.

Graceffo has been awarded black belts in three martial arts: Bokator (Black Krama) from Grand Master San Kim Saen in 2007; Kuntaw (KUMANDOS) From Grand Master Frank Aycocho in 2008, and Khmer boxing (BUSHIDO) from Paddy Carson in 2010.

Fight record
In 2011, Graceffo began competing in Mixed Martial Arts Exhibitions. He now has a record of 10 wins and 1 loss. Antonio also has 1 tie from an exhibition fight.

Antonio Graceffo Fight Record

Name: Antonio Graceffo

Height: 170 cm

Weight: 85 kg

Age: 51

Birth date: 6 September 1967

Style: Bokator

Fight record: 10 wins, 1 loss, and 1 exhibition match

Fighting out of: Ultimate MMA Academy, Johor Bahru, Malaysia

Notable accomplishments
In 2007 and 2008, Antonio was embedded with the Shan State Army in the war zone of Burma, reporting on the genocide. While embedded with the Shan State Army, Antonio taught hand-to-hand combat and basic knife fighting, as well as rifle bayonet training to new recruits.

Writing
Graceffo has written eight books in publication on martial arts. The Monk From Brooklyn: An American At The Shaolin Temple chronicled his studies near the Shaolin Temple during the SARS crisis. Warrior's Odyssey details Graceffo's first six years of travel in Asia through ten countries. His latest book, The Wrestler's Dissertation, is an examination of Chinese and Western wrestling.

Graceffo is a regular contributor to international news media including The Epoch Times (for which he comments on China's economy) and Black Belt Magazine. He writes about 70 articles per year for various online and print magazines and news outlets, and his byline has also appeared in South China Morning Post, AsiaOne, The Diplomat, War on the Rocks, Asia Times, RealClearWorld, bne IntelliNews, Inkstone, Lowy Institute, Just The News, Penthouse, Highbrow Magazine, New Right Network, Fight Times, and Bow International.

In 2018, Graceffo published two books focusing on the Chinese Economy.

Film and video
Krabei Liak Goan (Buffalo Protecting Child) was the start of Graceffo's movie career, providing him a co-starring role as the villain in the Khmer Kung Fu film. He also stars in another Khmer film titled Bokator.

Graceffo has worked as a martial arts consultant for TV shows such as Human Weapon, Digging for the Truth, Kill Arman, The Art of Fighting, Samantha Brown's Asia, Inside Martial Arts, Black Belt Magazine Destinations Video Column, and Thai TV shows about Muay Thai Chaiya and Kun Khmer Champions in Cambodia.

The web TV show Martial Arts Odyssey has over 100 videos on YouTube.

Books
 The Monk From Brooklyn: An American At The Shaolin Temple (July 15, 2004)
 Boat, Bikes, and Boxing Gloves: Adventure Writer in the Kingdom of Siam (April 28, 2005)
 Desert of Death on Three Wheels (June 28, 2005)
 Adventures in Formosa (December 28, 2006)
 Rediscovering The Khmers (August 18, 2008)
 Warrior Odyssey: The Travels of a Martial Artist in Asia (August 1, 2010)
 Khun Khmer: Cambodian Martial Art Diary (November 7, 2011)
 The Wrestler's Dissertation (January 2018)
 A Short Course on the Chinese Economy (March 2018)>
 A Deeper Look At The Chinese Economy, From Mao to Xi Jinping and Donald Trump (July 2018)
 Beyond the Belt and Road: China's Global Economic Expansion (March 2019)

References

External links
 
 
 

 
 
 

Living people
American male writers
Sportspeople from New York City
Martial arts writers
1967 births
Writers with dyslexia